U.S. Route 231 (US 231) is the longest numbered highway in Indiana, covering over . It is a main north–south highway in the western part of the state. The southern terminus of US 231 is at the Kentucky state line and the northern terminus is at US 41 just south of St. John. The highway is a mixture of expressway and two-lane roadway. The expressway portions exist mainly in southern Indiana and around the Lafayette area, with the rest mainly being two lanes.

Route description
US 231 contains two segments included as a part of the National Highway System (NHS). The first segment runs from the Kentucky state line to SR 558 and the second segment runs from I-70 to Lafayette. The highway is maintained by the Indiana Department of Transportation (INDOT) like all other U.S. Highways in the state. The department tracks the traffic volumes along all state highways as a part of its maintenance responsibilities using a metric called average annual daily traffic (AADT). This measurement is a calculation of the traffic level along a segment of roadway for any day of the year. In 2010, INDOT calculated that the section of US 231 with the lowest average daily traffic levels – with 1,100 vehicles and 180 commercial vehicles – was from US 52 to I–65. The peak traffic volumes on US 231 was 27,990 vehicles and 1,950 commercial vehicles AADT along the section concurrent with US 52.

Southern Indiana

US 231 enters Indiana on the William H. Natcher Bridge over the Ohio River from Kentucky. The road enters as a four–lane divided highway and immediately has a folded diamond interchange with State Road 66 (SR 66). The highway heads north passing a large, coal fired power plant (Rockport Generating Station) and through farmland towards Chrisney; the expressway then intersects with SR 70. The route turns northeast, passing through woods, just south of Lincoln State Park. The road turns north having an interchange with SR 162; this exit allows access to the State Park, as well as the Holiday World & Splashin' Safari theme park, a few miles to the east.

The expressway then turns northwest and skirts the south and west sides of Dale. On the south side of town, the roadway intersects SR 62; this is the old route of US 231, which joins the expressway for a brief period before turning east at the junction with SR 68. I–64 is a little more than a mile north from this point, with its interchange just south of the end of the expressway. 

U.S. 231 enters Dubois County, crossing into the Eastern Time Zone. From this point northward through the remainder of Southern Indiana, the highway will remain mostly a rural two-lane road.

US 231 heads towards Huntingburg, passing through rural farmland. The highway enters Huntingburg from the south, passing through residential areas. The route has a traffic light in downtown Huntingburg with SR 64. North of downtown Huntingburg, the road passes through commercial properties, before leaving town. The highway then heads north towards Jasper, passing by a mix of both farmland and woodland. US 231 enters Jasper from the south, passing by commercial lots. West of downtown Jasper, the route begins a concurrency with SR 56, with both routes heading east. The concurrency enters downtown and has a traffic light at the northern terminus of SR 164. That is intersection US 231 and SR 56 turn towards the north. The two highways head north into residential areas. The road leaves Jasper heading northeastward toward Loogootee. In Haysville, the concurrency with SR 56 ends. US 231 heads north-northeast from SR 54, before turning more northward. The highway enters Loogootee and begins a concurrency with both U.S. Route 50 (US 50) and US 150. The concurrency travels due north, then turns northeast and enters downtown Loogootee. In downtown, the concurrency ends, with US 50 and US 150 heading east and US 231 heading northwest. The highway then heads north towards Bloomfield, passing the Naval Surface Warfare Center Crane Division.

The route enters Bloomfield from the south, beginning a concurrency with SR 54 in downtown. This intersection is also the southern terminus of SR 157. This intersection is the northern terminus of SR 57. US 231 then heads north for about  until SR 67. The two routes head northeast heading towards Spencer, along the banks of the White River. The highway turns towards the north away from the river and the concurrency ends. SR 67 heads northeast again and US 231 heads northwest. The road then travels towards Cloverdale, passing through an intersection with SR 42. The route enters Cloverdale passing by a mix of commercial and residential properties. On the north side of Cloverdale, the highway becomes a four-lane divided highway, with an interchange at I–70.

Northern Indiana
North of I–70, US 231 narrows to a two-lane highway, heading towards the northwest. The route has a traffic light at US 40, south of Greencastle. The highway enters Greencastle from the southeast and begins to turn north, passing DePauw University to the west. In downtown Greencastle, the highway has a traffic light with the western terminus of SR 240. US 231 leaves Greencastle heading further north for Crawfordsville, passing through a traffic light at US 36, a brief concurrency with SR 236, and an intersection with SR 234. On the south side of Crawfordsville, the route becomes a four-lane undivided highway, passing through commercial development. The road then heads toward downtown Crawfordsville, and begins a concurrency with both SR 32 and SR 47. The concurrency passes Wabash College and has an intersection with US 136. At this intersection, the concurrency with SR 32 and SR 47 turns east onto US 136. US 231 becomes a four-lane divided highway north of US 136, heading through the north side of Crawfordsville. Through the north side of Crawfordsville, the road passes through mainly residential land, with a few commercial properties near the interchange with I–74.

North of I–74, the road returns to a two–lane rural highway and heads north for Lafayette. On the way to Lafayette, the route passes through rural farmland, paralleling a CSX rail line. The road enters Lafayette and becomes a four-lane divided highway as it runs through a mix of farmland and residential areas. The highway has a traffic light at SR 25. , the route crosses the Wabash River and heads for West Lafayette, where it runs along the south and west edges of the Purdue campus. US 231, which has been joined by US 52 by this point, continues north for a few miles, then turns westbound. US 231 then leaves the concurrency, while US 52 continues northwest and US 231 heads due north.

North of US 52, the highway becomes a two-lane rural highway passing through farmland. US 231 has an interchange with I–65; this is the first of four interchanges with I–65. The route begins a concurrency with US 24 in Wolcott. The two highways head north through Wolcott and then turn due west. After Wolcott, the concurrency crosses into Jasper County and into the Central Time Zone. The two routes have an interchange at I–65 east of Remington. In Remington, the concurrency ends, with US 24 continuing due west and US 231 heading due north again. The road then enters Rensselaer, heads north and turns northeast, with a traffic light at SR 114. North of the traffic light, the road makes a sharp turn and heads northwest. North of Rensselaer, the route turns north once again, heading towards SR 10. At SR 10, US 231 turns due west, concurrent with the state road. After , the concurrency ends, with SR 10 traveling south and US 231 continuing north. The highway then enters Porter County on a bridge over the Kankakee River.

North of the Kankakee River, the route begins a concurrency with SR 2 at a four-way stop south of Hebron. The concurrency enters Hebron from the south, passing mainly residential areas. The concurrency has an intersection with the western terminus of SR 8 at the main intersection in downtown. North of downtown, the concurrency with SR 2 ends with SR 2 heading due north and US 231 heading northwest. The road leaves Hebron, passing more residential properties and heading towards Crown Point. On the southeast side of Crown Point, the route has its last interchange with I–65. After I–65, the road has an intersection with SR 55. Passing through the southeast side of Crown Point, the road is lined with housing additions on both sides. The road then begins a concurrency with SR 55 and the two highways head for downtown Crown Point. In downtown Crown Point, the routes go around the county courthouse on one-way streets. The concurrency ends when the state road heads due north. US 231 then leaves Crown Point, heading towards its northern terminus on the south side of St. John. The route turns west for the last few miles to meet US 41. US 231 meets US 41 at an intersection controlled by a traffic light.

History

Before US 231

Between 1918 and 1926, US 231 was signed SR 18 from Rockport to Old SR 4 and then followed Old SR 4 to Jasper. From Jasper to Bloomfield, the route consisted of unimproved county roads. From Bloomfield to Switz City, the future US 231 followed Old SR 30. North of Switz City, the road was SR 12, which eventually became SR 67. From Jasper to Lafayette, the road was numbered as SR 32. Where the future US 231 followed SR 29, the route became what is now US 52. From Wolcott to Remington, the route followed SR 7. North of Remington, the road was numbered SR 8 until reaching Hebron. From Hebron to the current terminus was an unimproved county road. This system was changed in 1926 when the U.S. Highways were created.

The current number system in Indiana was put into place in 1926. The route that would become US 231 was signed as SR 45 from Rockport to SR 58 in Scotland.  From Scotland to Bloomfield, it was an unimproved county road. From Bloomfield to Spencer, the future US 231 was given the same number that the route is concurrent with today. North of Spencer to Lafayette it was numbered SR 43. The route that US 231 follows today along US 52 was the same. The section of US 231 north of US 52 to US 41 was signed as US 152. The US 152 designation was used between February 1935 and 1938; in 1938 US 152 was decommissioned.  The road then went back to state road numbers; this lasted until 1952 when US 231 was commissioned and signs installed.

As US 231
US 231 was first signed in Indiana in 1954; the whole length of US 231 was two-lanes. In Southern Indiana, the road has been widened from a two-lane surface road to a four-lane divided expressway. The expressway construction began in 2002 with a new bridge over the Ohio River; the state designated the old bridge near Owensboro, KY as SR 161. When the bridge was completed, traffic had to exit the expressway at the first exit on to SR 66. The expressway was built north towards Dale on all new terrain, with some of the old highway being signed as SR 161, SR 62, and the rest becoming county roads. US 231 was moved onto the expressway on March 15, 2011. In Northern Indiana, a new routing of US 231 around the south and west sides of the Lafayette/West Lafayette area opened September 13, 2013. Previously, US 231 entered downtown Lafayette from the south on 4th Street, passed over the Wabash River on the Harrison Bridge, then continued north and northwest in West Lafayette on Northwestern Avenue passing Purdue University, until merging with US 52.

Future
A project is planned that will put US 231 on a four-lane divided highway around Huntingburg and Jasper in the southern part of the state.

Major intersections

See also

References

External links

 Indiana
31-2
Transportation in Spencer County, Indiana
Transportation in Dubois County, Indiana
Transportation in Martin County, Indiana
Transportation in Daviess County, Indiana
Transportation in Greene County, Indiana
Transportation in Owen County, Indiana
Transportation in Putnam County, Indiana
Transportation in Montgomery County, Indiana
Transportation in Tippecanoe County, Indiana
Transportation in White County, Indiana
Transportation in Jasper County, Indiana
Transportation in Porter County, Indiana
Transportation in Lake County, Indiana